Hampshire Premier is an English level 9 Rugby Union league for teams based in Hampshire and the Isle of Wight.  Up until the 2017–18 season it was known as Hampshire 1 but was changed to Hampshire Premier due to restructuring of the Hampshire leagues, which would see the re-introduction of a third division as well as 2nd and 3rd XV sides joining for the first time.  Each year some of the clubs in this division also take part in the RFU Junior Vase - a level 9-12 national competition.

Promoted teams move up to London 3 South West with the league winners going straight up and the runners up playing against the runners up from Surrey 1.  Relegated teams drop down to Hampshire 1.  Only 1st XV sides can be promoted up into London 3 South West, although any side can be relegated to Hampshire 1.

The points system is as follows.

4 points awarded for a win.
2 points awarded for a draw.
0 points awarded for a loss.
1 "bonus" (+) point awarded for scoring 4 tries (or more).
1 "bonus" (+) point awarded for losing by 7 points (or fewer).

No team can get more than 5 points in a match. Points awarded are the same regardless of outcome at home or away. The new point system has been in effect since 2010–11 season.

Teams for 2021-22

The teams competing in 2021-22 achieved their places in the league based on performances in 2019-20, the 'previous season' column in the table below refers to that season not 2020-21.

Season 2020–21

On 30th October the RFU announced that a decision had been taken to cancel Adult Competitive Leagues (National League 1 and below) for the 2020/21 season meaning Hampshire Premier was not contested.

Teams for 2019-20

Teams for 2018-19

Teams for 2017-18

Teams for 2016-17
Chineham
Ellingham & Ringwood
Fareham Heathens
Farnborough
Fordingbridge
Isle of Wight
New Milton & District (promoted from London 3 South West)
Petersfield
Romsey (promoted from Hampshire 2)
Sandown & Shanklin
Ventnor (promoted from Hampshire 2)

Teams and results for 2015-16

Chineham (promoted from Hampshire 2)Ellingham & Ringwood (relegated from London 3 South West)Locksheath Pumas (promoted from Hampshire 2)Sandown & Shanklin (relegated from London 3 South West)'''

Teams and Results for 2014-2015

Fareham and Petersfield promoted into Hampshire 1 at the start of the season from Hampshire 2.

Teams and Results for 2013-2014

Solent Uni promoted into Hampshire 1 at the start of the season from Hampshire 2.

Andover promoted to London South West 3 at the end of the season.

Southampton and Overton demoted to Hampshire 2 at the end of the season.

Teams and Results for 2012-13

Southampton promoted into Hampshire 1 at the start of the season from Hampshire 2.

New Milton & District promoted to London 3 South West at the end of the season.

Aldershot & Fleet and Petersfield demoted to Hampshire 2 at the end of the season.

Teams and Results for 2011-12

Southsea Nomads promoted into Hampshire 1 at the start of the season from Hampshire 2.

Lytchett Minster transferred to Dorset and Wilts Regional Leagues at the end of the season.

Eastleigh promoted to London 3 South West at the end of the season.

Southsea Nomads and Ventnor demoted to Hampshire 2 at the end of the season.

Teams and Results for 2010-11

Andover promoted to London 3 South West at the end of the season.

Fareham Heathens and Southampton demoted to Hampshire 2 at the end of the season.

Teams and Results for 2009-10

Alton promoted to London 3 South West at the end of the season.

Aldershot & Fleet demoted to Hampshire 2 at the end of the season.

Teams and Results for 2008-09

Original teams

When league rugby began in 1987 this division (known as Hampshire 1) contained the following teams:

Esso
Fareham Heathens
Gosport
Isle Of Wight
Millbrook
New Milton & District
Petersfield
Rushmoor
Sandown & Shanklin
Southampton
Tottonians

Hampshire Premier honours

Hampshire 1 (1987–1993)

Originally known as Hampshire 1, it was tier 8 league with promotion up to London 3 South West and relegation down to Hampshire 2.

Hampshire 1 (1993–1996)

The creation of National 5 South meant that Hampshire 1 dropped from a tier 8 league to a tier 9 league for the years that National 5 South was active.  Promotion and relegation continued to London 3 South West and Hampshire 2 respectively.

Hampshire 1 (1996–2000)

The cancellation of National 5 South at the end of the 1995–96 season meant that Hampshire 1 reverted to being a tier 8 league.  Promotion and relegation continued to London 3 South West and Hampshire 2 respectively.

Hampshire 1 (2000–2009)

The introduction of London 4 South West ahead of the 2000–01 season meant Hampshire 1 dropped to become a tier 9 league with promotion to this new division.  Relegation continued to Hampshire 1.

Hampshire 1 (2009–2018)

Hampshire 1 remained a tier 9 league despite national restructuring by the RFU.  Promotion was to London 3 South West (formerly London 4 South West) and relegation to Hampshire 2.

Hampshire Premier (2018–present)

Restructuring of the Hampshire leagues saw Hampshire 1 renamed as Hampshire Premier.  It remained a tier 9 league with promotion to London 3 South West and relegation to the new Hampshire 1 (formerly Hampshire 2).

Promotion play-offs
Since the 2000–01 season there has been a play-off between the runners-up of Hampshire Premier and Surrey 1 for the third and final promotion place to London 3 South West. The team with the superior league record has home advantage in the tie.  At the end of the 2019–20 season the Surrey 1 teams have been the most successful with twelve wins to the Hampshire Premier teams seven; and the home team has won promotion on eleven occasions compared to the away teams eight.

Number of league titles

Andover (3)
Petersfield (3)
United Services Portsmouth (3)
Eastleigh (2)
Gosport (2)
Jersey (2)
Southampton (2)
Trojans (2)
Winchester (2)
Alton (1)
Basingstoke (1)
Ellingham & Ringwood (1)
Esso (1)
Farnborough (1)
Fordingbridge (1)
Guernsey (1)
Millbrook (1)
New Milton & District (1)
Romsey (1)
Tottonians (1)

See also
London & SE Division RFU
Hampshire RFU
English rugby union system
Rugby union in England

Notes

References

9
Rugby union in Hampshire